Myyrmäen jalkapallostadion (Myyrmäki Football Stadium),, formerly ISS Stadion and Pohjola Stadion is a football stadium in the Myyrmäki district of Vantaa, Finland. It is the homeground of PK-35 Vantaa, its men's representative team plays in the Kolmonen and its women's representative team plays in the top-tier Kansallinen Liiga. The stadium holds 4,700 and was built in 2000.

The IFAF 2018 European Championship of American Football will be held in Myyrmäen jalkapallostadion at 29 July - 4 August 2018.

Specs
Pitch: Artificial turf
Pitch dimensions: 105*68
Floodlights: 1,500 lux

See also
 Energia Areena

References

Football venues in Finland
Buildings and structures in Vantaa
2000 establishments in Finland
Sports venues completed in 2000
American football venues in Finland